Vania King and Yaroslava Shvedova were the defending champions and they reached the final. Liezel Huber and Lisa Raymond defeated them 4–6, 7–6(7–5), 7–6(7–3) to win the title.

Seeds

Draw

Finals

Top half

Section 1

Section 2

Bottom half

Section 3

Section 4

References

External links
 Main Draw
2011 US Open – Women's draws and results at the International Tennis Federation

Women's Doubles
US Open - Women's Doubles
US Open (tennis) by year – Women's doubles
2011 in women's tennis
2011 in American women's sports